The Ulan Malgait Formation is a Late Jurassic geologic formation in Mongolia. Dinosaur remains are among the fossils that have been recovered from the formation, although  none have yet been referred to a specific genus.

It is best known for the Shar Teeg locality which has lent its name to Shartegosuchidae, a family of mesoeucrocodylians (relatives of crocodilians), many of which have been found there; Shartegosuchus (the family's type genus) means "Shar Teeg crocodile". It is divided up into 2 subunits, the lower Shar Teg Beds and the upper Ulan Malgait Beds.

The tritylodontids Shartegodon, Nuurtherium and Bienotheroides are known from the formation., As is docodontan Tegotherium. The turtles Annemys levensis and Annemys latiens and crocodylians Sunosuchus shartegensis and Adzhosuchus fuscus were also recovered from the formation. Numerous species of insects are also known from the formation. which was deposited in a lacustrine environment.

Age 
Dollman et al. (2018) argue that the age of the Ulan Malgait Formation is likely to be Oxfordian based on the shared presence of Shartegosuchus and Nominosuchus with the radiometrically-dated Shishigou Formation of China.

See also 
 List of dinosaur-bearing rock formations
 List of stratigraphic units with indeterminate dinosaur fossils

References

Bibliography

Further reading 

 M. Rabi, V. B. Sukhanov, V. N. Egorova, I. Danilov, and W. G. Joyce. 2014. Osteology, relationships, and ecology of Annemys (Testudines, Eucryptodira) from the Late Jurassic of Shar Teg, Mongolia, and phylogenetic definitions for Xinjiangchelyidae, Sinemydidae, and Macrobaenidae. Journal of Vertebrate Paleontology 34(2):327-352
 M. Watabe, K. Tsogtbaatar, T. Tsuihiji and R. Barsbold. 2003. The first discovery of diverse Jurassic dinosaur faunas in Mongolia. Journal of Vertebrate Paleontology 23(3, suppl.):108A
 V. B. Sukhanov. 2000. Mesozoic turtles of Middle and Central Asia. In M. J. Benton, M. A. Shishkin, D. M. Unwin, & E N. Kurichkin (eds.), The Age of Dinosaurs in Russia and Mongolia 309-367
 Y. M. Gubin and S. M. Sinitza. 1996. Shar Teg: a unique Mesozoic locality of Asia. In M. Morales (ed.), The Continental Jurassic. Museum of Northern Arizona Bulletin 60:311-318 

Geologic formations of Mongolia
Jurassic System of Asia
Jurassic Mongolia
Tithonian Stage
Oxfordian Stage
Sandstone formations
Siltstone formations
Lacustrine deposits
Paleontology in Mongolia
Formations